Ohakuri is a rural community in the Taupō District and Waikato region of New Zealand's North Island. It features the Orakei Korako Geothermal Area, the artificial Lake Ohakuri and the Ohakuri Dam.

The area also includes Maroanui Marae, a meeting place of the local Ngāti Tūwharetoa hapū of Ngāti Hinerau. It features a meeting house of the same name. The marae was renovated between 2008 and 2010, with a grant from the nearby Wairakei Power Station. The renovations included wheelchair ramps and accessible toilets for disabled members of the hapū.

Demographics

Ohakuri statistical area had a population of 1,842 at the 2018 New Zealand census, an increase of 171 people (10.2%) since the 2013 census, and an increase of 408 people (28.5%) since the 2006 census. There were 654 households, comprising 963 males and 879 females, giving a sex ratio of 1.1 males per female. The median age was 39.4 years (compared with 37.4 years nationally), with 393 people (21.3%) aged under 15 years, 345 (18.7%) aged 15 to 29, 918 (49.8%) aged 30 to 64, and 183 (9.9%) aged 65 or older.

Ethnicities were 82.1% European/Pākehā, 21.2% Māori, 2.4% Pacific peoples, 5.4% Asian, and 1.3% other ethnicities. People may identify with more than one ethnicity.

The percentage of people born overseas was 15.3, compared with 27.1% nationally.

Although some people chose not to answer the census's question about religious affiliation, 59.8% had no religion, 28.5% were Christian, 1.8% had Māori religious beliefs, 0.3% were Hindu, 0.3% were Muslim, 0.5% were Buddhist and 2.3% had other religions.

Of those at least 15 years old, 201 (13.9%) people had a bachelor's or higher degree, and 267 (18.4%) people had no formal qualifications. The median income was $38,400, compared with $31,800 nationally. 258 people (17.8%) earned over $70,000 compared to 17.2% nationally. The employment status of those at least 15 was that 879 (60.7%) people were employed full-time, 258 (17.8%) were part-time, and 24 (1.7%) were unemployed.

Ohakuri community is in meshblocks 1263500 and 1276201, which cover  and had a population of 48 in the 2018 census.

See also
Ohakuri Caldera

References

Taupō District
Populated places in Waikato
Populated places on the Waikato River